The Flower Book may refer to:

 The Flower Book (album), a compilation album by the French singer/songwriter Émilie Simon